National Academy of Defence Production is a training and development institute incorporated under Ordnance Factory Board. It imparts training to the Group-A gazetted officers recruited under Indian Ordnance Factories Service.The academy also offers Group-A officers serving in various ordnance factories a mid-career training program.

History

The National Academy of Defence Production, erstwhile known as the Ordnance Factory Staff College, was established in 1978 with a sole purpose to impart training to the officers recruited under the Indian Ordnance Factories Service, a group A gazetted service under the Ministry of Defence of the government of India. Indian Ordnance Factories Service officers are responsible for the functioning of ordnance factories whose existence dates as far back 300 years.

Programme
The institute conducts 64 weeks induction programme to the candidates (i.e. probationary officers) who are later deputed to Ordnance factories. It is quite a holistic training program that imparts basic skills needed among the newly recruited officers to run the various ordnance factories located all over the country. The program starts with introduction module followed by general administration and general management module.

The programme also includes attachments to:
 Various ordnance factories
 Visit to Ordnance Factory Board
 Defence Institute of Advanced Technology
 DRDO labs
 Visit to proof ranges – LPR Khamaria, CPE Itarsi, PXE Balasore
 Armed forces attachment
 Army attachment – visit to different army base camp such Amritsar, is carried out. The location of attachment changes every year.
 Navy attachment – Any one of location Kochi, Mumbai and Vishakhapatnam
 Air Force attachment

Officers are also taken to parliament attachment for one week and the program culminates by meeting with the President of India and Minister of Defence. This training program is in line with training programmes of various other civil services of government of India.
The candidates are selected through Civil Services Examination and the Engineering Services Examination, conducted by Union Public Service Commission.

Facilities

The institute is well equipped with the training facilities. It includes audio-video teaching aids, fully computerized library and subscription to various periodicals relevant to the training programme. There is 35 node LAN network inside campus for internet access. The exhibition center has a number of ammunition devices and defense technologies on display for the probationary officers. There is yoga center and courts for various sports such as billiards, badminton, tennis, volley ball and table tennis. Various fests are organised by the probationers on regular basis including sports meets with nearby academies like NADT(national academy of direct taxes). There is a well equipped gym, swimming pool , indoor badminton court, basketball court and a cricket ground as well. Blood donation camps, PT, self defence training for lady officers and cultural programmes are organised regularly.

References 

Military academies of India
1978 establishments in Maharashtra
Educational institutions established in 1978